Fack ju Göhte 2 (intentional misspelling of "Fuck you, Goethe") is a 2015 German comedy directed by Bora Dağtekin and starring Elyas M'Barek, Karoline Herfurth and Jella Haase, while upcoming actors Max von der Groeben and Volker Bruch appear as supporting roles. The film, produced by Constantin Film, is the sequel to the 2013 film Fack ju Göhte. It premiered on 7 September 2015 in Munich and was released nationwide three days later. It was released in the United States under the title Suck Me Shakespeer 2.

Synopsis 
Mr. Müller is not satisfied with his new work at the Goethe-Gesamtschule. Having to get up early and correcting exams annoys him. Director Gerster wants to improve the image of the school because she wants to be a symbol of the new public campaign. To achieve this, she wants to take away the partnership from the Schiller gymnasium with a school in Thailand. So Mr. Müller, Ms. Schnabelstedt and the 10/B class must go on a school trip to Thailand to a remote village.

Cast 
 Elyas M'Barek as Zeki Müller
 Karoline Herfurth as Elisabeth "Lisi" Schnabelstedt
 Jana Pallaske as Charlie
 Katja Riemann as Gudrun Gerster
 Volker Bruch as Hauke Wölki
 Jella Haase as Chantal
 Alwara Höfels as Caro Meyer
 Rouven Blessing as Student
 Max von der Groeben as Danger
 Uschi Glas as Ingrid Leimbach-Knorr
 Anna Lena Klenke as Laura
 Christoph Schechinger as Police Officer Schneider
 Gizem Emre as Zeynep
 Michael Maertens as Eckhard Badebrecht
 Zsa Zsa Inci Bürkle as Silke
 Luise von Finckh as Charlotte
 Bernd Stegemann as Gundlach
 Saichia Wongwirot as Museum Guard
 Enissa Amani as Stewardess
 Aram Arami as Burak
 Farid Bang as Paco
 Johannes Nussbaum as Cedric
 Lucas Reiber as Etienne
 Runa Greiner as Meike
 K.M. Lo as Director Mr. Long
 Emma Voltmer as Naomi
 Niklas Nißl as Torben
 Maximilian Waldmann as Noel
 Omar Azaitar as Musti

Production

Casting 
Elyas M'Barek, Karoline Herfurth and Jella Haase reprise their main roles from the first film. Katja Riemann, Max von der Groeben, Gizem Emre, Aram Arami appear as well. Volker Bruch was cast as the new teacher Hauke Wölki.

Filming 
Filming took place in Munich and Berlin. The Lise-Meitner-Gymnasium in Unterhaching served as the backdrop of the Goethe-Gesamtschule. Some parts were also shot in Thailand, among others in Bangkok.

Release 
The premiere was held at the Mathäser Cinema in Munich on 7 September 2015. It was released in cinemas on 10 September.

Reception
The film had 2.1 million admissions in its opening weekend in Germany, a record for a German film. After six weeks, it was the highest-grossing German film in Germany and went on to gross $65.2 million.

Soundtrack 
 Lena Meyer-Landrut – Wild & Free
 Djorkaeff, Beatzarre – Fack ju Göhte 2 Beat
 Walk off the Earth – Rule The World
 Charli XCX – Famous
 Djorkaeff, Beatzarre – It's Gonna Be Alright
 Lunchmoney Lewis – Bills
 Djorkaeff, Beatzarre – Pausenhof Beat
 Olly Murs – Wrapped Up
 Carly Rae Jepsen – "Call Me Maybe"
 Djorkaeff, Beatzarre – Diamanten Beat
 Nitro – Get It Up
 Nitro – Wilding Out
 Jason Derulo – "Talk Dirty (Jason Derulo song)"
 B-Case – Sicherheitskontrolle Beat
 Djorkaeff, Beatzarre – Mcdive Beat
 Djorkaeff, Beatzarre – Here Comes The Sun
 Flipsyde – Laserbeam
 OneRepublic –"Counting Stars"
 Djorkaeff, Beatzarre – Kannst Du Mich Verstehen Beat
 Djorkaeff, Beatzarre – Uschi auf Lsd Beat
Sigma – Changing
 Janieck Devy – Don't Give Up On Us

References

External links 
 
 

German comedy films
Films set in Thailand
2010s high school films
Films shot in Thailand
German sequel films
2010s German films